Criștioru de Jos is a commune in Bihor County, Crișana, Romania with a population of 1,354 people. It is composed of five villages: Bâlc, Criștioru de Jos, Criștioru de Sus (Felsőbiharkristyór), Poiana (Biharmező) and Săliște de Vașcău (Vaskohszeleste).

References

Communes in Bihor County
Localities in Crișana